Burkina Faso–Russia relations are the bilateral relations between the two countries, Burkina Faso and Russia. Diplomatic relations between Burkina Faso and the Soviet Union were established for the first time on February 18, 1967. After the breakup of the Soviet Union, Burkina Faso recognized Russia as the USSR's successor. However financial reasons has shut the embassies between the two nations. In 1992, the embassy of the Russian Federation in Ouagadougou was closed, and in 1996, the embassy of Burkina Faso in Moscow was closed. Burkina Faso has since re-opened its embassy in Moscow. Russia is accredited to Burkina Faso from its embassy in Abidjan (Côte d'Ivoire).

In 2000, between Russia and Burkina Faso signed an intergovernmental agreement on visa-free travel for diplomatic and service passports. Trade and economic relations are limited to occasional business contacts between business structures. The turnover in 2008 amounted to 3.2 million dollars (mostly Russian exports). Higher education in Russia received about 3,500 students from Burkina Faso. In the 2008/2009 academic year, Burkina Faso has been allocated two scholarships for education in Russian universities at the expense of the federal budget, but which were not used.

On July 26, 2007, Burkina Faso's ambassador to Moscow, Xavier Niodogo, handed a copy of credentials to the Deputy Minister of Foreign Affairs of the Russian Federation, Alexander V. During the meeting discussed a number of international, including African problems, as well as the development of the bilateral relations between the two nations. Niodogo praised the approach of Russia to assist African countries, especially in alleviating their debt burden, tackling the problems of socio-economic development of our country's role in resolving conflicts on the African continent.

See also
Foreign relations of Burkina Faso
Foreign relations of Russia

References

External links
Russian ministry of foreign affairs about relations with Burkina Faso

 
Africa–Russia relations
Russia
Bilateral relations of Russia